Hampden & Co. is a UK independent private bank for high-net-worth individuals, their families and businesses.

The bank was founded in June 2015 and was the first of its kind to launch in the UK in 30 years.  The bank has offices in Charlotte Square, Edinburgh and Dover Street in Mayfair, London.

In May 2018, a second Edinburgh office was opened close to the Charlotte Square headquarters to house operational and administrational teams.

History
Hampden & Co was incorporated on 12 October 2010, under the temporary name of “Scoban”. The company changed its name to “Hampden & Co” on 18 June 2015 prior to opening.

The name “Hampden & Co” reflects one of their major shareholders, the Hampden Group, and commemorates John Hampden, the 17th century English politician who was one of the parliamentarians who challenged the authority of King Charles I.

Board and investors
As an independent private bank, Hampden & Co is backed by four cornerstone shareholders and hundreds of smaller investors who collectively raised over £60m in capital for the 2015 launch. Of the four cornerstone investors, one is The Hampden Group, which is a family owned company, focusing on insurance and financial services sectors.  Its key areas of operation are in Lloyd's Members' Agency services, underwriting, insurance company administration, bespoke Run-Off insurance management, audit, tax and consultancy services.

Another cornerstone investor is XL Bermuda Ltd, a subsidiary of the insurance focused conglomerate Axa.

In August 2018 founding Chairman Ray Entwistle announced he would step down from the board of Hampden & Co, but remain employed in a new capacity as “Founder”. In January 2018 Ray Entwistle was appointed OBE for services to charity and the arts.

Hampden & Co is headed by CEO Graeme Hartop, former Managing Director of Scottish Widows Bank, and Simon Miller, who returned as Chairman in May 2020 having previously helped to found the bank in 2010.

Hampden & Co's other board members are:
 Jonathan Peake – Finance Director
 David Huntley – Non-executive Director
 Caroline Taylor – Non-executive Director
 Finlay Williamson – Non-executive Director
Angus Macpherson - Non-executive Director

Services and affiliations
Hampden & Co provides day-to-day banking services, including current accounts, bank cards, digital banking and foreign exchange services, deposit accounts, and bespoke lending, including residential, retirement, family (guarantor), self-build, buy-to-let and multi-property mortgages.

In 2018, Hampden & Co entered the intermediary mortgage market to offer services to many high-net-worth clients who use mortgage brokers to arrange their property finance.

In January 2019, the bank launched a mobile banking app to add digital banking services.

In June 2022, they teamed up with Hiscox Private Client to offer their clients bespoke insurance services.

References 

Banks of the United Kingdom
Banks established in 2015
British companies established in 2015